David Porter (born July 6, 1949 in Bowmanville, Ontario) is  a former Canadian ice dancer.  With partner Barbara Berezowski, he won two gold medals at the Canadian Figure Skating Championships and competed at the 1976 Winter Olympics.

On October 23, 2008, Porter was inducted into the Scuggog Sports Wall of Fame in Port Perry, Ontario.

Currently, Porter is the president of Port Fire Pyrotechnics and Special Effects and its consumer fireworks subsidiary, Wizard Pyrotechnics.

Competitive highlights
(with Berezowski)

1971
Junior Canadian Champions - 1st -Winnipeg, Manitoba
1972
Lake Placid Invitational Championships - 1st -New York, USA
1973
Canadian Championships - 2nd - Vancouver, British Columbia
1974
Moscow Invitational Championships - 5th - Moscow, USSR
1975
Moscow Invitational Championships - 5th - Moscow, USSR
1976
Prestige Cutlery Awards - 3rd - London, England
Berezowski / Porter became the first ice dancers in the world to become Olympians.

Professional appearances

In 1976, Berezowski / Porter turned professional and toured with Toller Cranston's "The Ice Show" until 1977.

Berezowski / Porter appeared on the Canadian program "Stars on Ice" across several episodes from 1976 to 1980; including a performance in the series opener of September 21, 1976.

Berezowski / Porter performed with Ice Follies from 1978 until 1980.

References

External links
Wizard Fireworks

1949 births
Canadian male ice dancers
Figure skaters at the 1976 Winter Olympics
Olympic figure skaters of Canada
Living people
People from Scugog
Sportspeople from Clarington
20th-century Canadian people